Ishikawatrechus is a genus of beetles in the family Carabidae, containing the following species:

 Ishikawatrechus cerberus Ueno, 1957
 Ishikawatrechus hayashii Ueno, 1999
 Ishikawatrechus humeralis Ueno, 1957
 Ishikawatrechus intermedius Ueno, 1957(extinct)
 Ishikawatrechus ishiharai Ueno, 1994
 Ishikawatrechus ishikawai Ueno, 1951
 Ishikawatrechus kusamai Ueno, 1999
 Ishikawatrechus longipes Ueno, 1992
 Ishikawatrechus murakamii Ueno, 1997
 Ishikawatrechus nipponicus Habu, 1950
 Ishikawatrechus obliquatus Ueno, 1997
 Ishikawatrechus ochii Ueno, 1996
 Ishikawatrechus professoris Ueno, 1999
 Ishikawatrechus riozoi Ueno, 1999
 Ishikawatrechus robustior Ueno, 1997
 Ishikawatrechus squamosus Ueno, 1997
 Ishikawatrechus subtilis Ueno, 1957
 Ishikawatrechus uozumii Ueno, 1951
 Ishikawatrechus yosiianus Ueno, 1999

References

Trechinae